Derek Malone is a paralympic athlete from Ireland competing mainly in category T38 middle-distance events.

Derek competed in the 2000 and 2004 Summer Paralympics.  In his first games he competed in the 5000m and 800m before changing to the 800m and 400m in his second games where he won the 800m bronze in the T38 class.

References

Paralympic athletes of Ireland
Athletes (track and field) at the 2000 Summer Paralympics
Athletes (track and field) at the 2004 Summer Paralympics
Paralympic bronze medalists for Ireland
Living people
Medalists at the 2004 Summer Paralympics
Year of birth missing (living people)
Paralympic medalists in athletics (track and field)
Irish male middle-distance runners